This is a list of Indian princely states, as they existed during the British Raj before 1947.

Before the Partition of India in 1947, hundreds  of  Princely States, also called Native States, existed in India. These states were not a part of British India but enjoyed a British protectorate under a subsidiary alliance and some indirect rule. They were the parts of the Indian subcontinent which had not been conquered or annexed by the British, often former vassals of the Mughal Baadshah (Emperor).

The states are listed alphabetically; this list complements the List of princely states of British India, which is arranged by region and agency.

Geographical and administrative assigning is indicative, as various names and borders have changed significantly, even entities (provinces, principalities) split, merged, renamed et cetera.

Furthermore, criteria of statehood (used for inclusion) differ between sources.

In some cases, several name variations or completely different names are included.

Sortable list of former princely states

See also 

 List of princely states of British India (by region)
 List of Maratha dynasties and states
 List of Rajput dynasties and states

Sources and references 
 Indian Princely States Genealogy Queensland University
 Flags of Indian Princely States

Further reading
 Seymour, William. "The Indian States under the British Crown" History Today. (Dec 1967), Vol. 17 Issue 12, pp 819–827 online; covers 1858 to 1947.

History of Pakistan
History of India
Princely States
Pakistan history-related lists
Subdivisions of British India